Gipsy is an offensive slur that many use to refer to the Romani people.
Gipsy is not widely known to be an offensive racial slur, but it is becoming recognized as such 
Gipsy or GIPSY may also refer to:

Music
 Gipsy.cz, a Romani hip hop group
 Gipsy Kings, a French rumba flamenco group
 Gipsy music (disambiguation)

People
 Gipsy Daniels (1903–1967), Welsh boxer
 Gipsy Petulengro (1859–1957), British Romani businessman and broadcaster
 Rodney "Gipsy" Smith (1860–1947), British evangelist

Places
 Gipsy, Missouri
 Gipsy, Pennsylvania
 Gipsy-1,  a system of adits in Tatarstan, Russia, where gypsum was mined
 Gipsy Hill, in London, England

Transport
 Austin Gipsy, a British off-road vehicle produced 1958–1967
 de Havilland Gipsy, a British aircraft engine designed in 1927 
 HMS Gipsy, the name of several Royal Navy ships
 Gipsy-class destroyer, a Royal Navy ship class
 Gipsy Hill railway station in London, England

Other uses
 Gipsy (comics), a graphic novel series
 Gipsy (dog), a large, long-lived dog buried in Brooklyn, New York
 Gipsy Row, a hamlet in the county of Suffolk, England
 Gipsies Football Club, a 19th-century rugby football club notable for being one of the founding members of the Rugby Football Union
 General Intensional Programming System (GIPSY), a dialect of the programming language Lucid

See also
 Gypsy (disambiguation)
 Gyp (disambiguation)